Eustathia cultrifera  is a  feather mite found on swifts.

References

Sarcoptiformes
Animals described in 1877
Parasites of birds